The 1954 Washington Huskies football team was an American football team that represented the University of Washington during the 1954 college football season. In its second season under head coach John Cherberg, the team compiled a 2–8 record, finished in a tie for last place in the Pacific Coast Conference, and was outscored by its opponents 215 to 78. Stewart Crook was the team captain.

Schedule

NFL Draft selections
One University of Washington Husky was selected in the 1955 NFL Draft, which lasted thirty rounds with 360 selections.

References

External links
 Game program: Washington at Washington State – November 20, 1954

Washington
Washington Huskies football seasons
Washington Huskies football